Vailimia is a genus of Asian jumping spiders. It was originally thought to be close to Harmochirus, but the male pedipalp, chelicera, and cephalothorax drawn by Proszynski in 1984, and information gained from later collected specimens indicates otherwise. Subsequently, five more species have been identified. It may be a synonym for Pancorius.

Name
The genus was originally named Vailima after the name of the last residence of Robert Louis Stevenson and the village where it is situated. The genus name Vailima was erected by Peckham & Peckham in 1907. However, the name was misspelled Vailimia by Prószyński in 2003. The alternate name Vailimia in 2006 was suggested by C. F. Kammerer as the name was found to be preoccupied by the fish genus Vailima.

Species
Most species are found in Borneo, though Vailimia longitibia was first identified in China, and Vailimia ajmerensis and Vailimia jharbari have been described from India.  it contains six species, all found in Asia:
Vailimia ajmerensis Caleb & Jangid, 2020 – India
Vailimia bakoensis Prószyński & Deeleman-Reinhold, 2013 – Borneo
Vailimia jharbari Basumatary, Caleb & Das, 2020 – India

Vailimia jianyuae Prószyński & Deeleman-Reinhold, 2013 – Borneo
Vailimia longitibia Guo, Zhang & Zhu, 2011 – China
Vailimia masinei (Peckham & Peckham, 1907) (type) – Borneo

References

Further reading

Endemic fauna of Borneo
Monotypic Salticidae genera
Salticidae
Spiders of Asia